Colin Craig Kidd  (born 5 May 1964) is a historian who specializes in American and Scottish history. He is currently Professor of History at the University of St Andrews, after he served as Professor of Intellectual History and the History of Political Thought at Queen's University Belfast, where he has worked since he left the University of Glasgow in 2010.
 
Kidd is a fellow of All Souls College Oxford and a regular contributor to the London Review of Books, where he commentates on topics such as current affairs, economics and politics, as well as reviewing literary works. Kidd was an undergraduate at Gonville and Caius College, Cambridge, before winning the Prize Fellowship at All Souls, Oxford University to complete his D.Phil. Kidd says he chose to become a historian after being inspired by the 18th century literature of Laurence Sterne. Prior to arriving at St Andrews, Professor Kidd held fellowships at Belfast, Glasgow, Oxford and Harvard Universities. In 2017 he delivered the British Academy's Raleigh Lecture on History.

His own literary works include: Subverting Scotland's Past: Scottish Whig Historians and the Creation of an Anglo-British Identity 1689–1830 (1993); British Identities Before Nationalism: Ethnicity and Nationhood in the Atlantic World, 1600–1800 (1999); The Forging of Races: Race and Scripture in the Protestant Atlantic World, 1600–2000 (2006); and Union and Unionisms: Political Thought in Scotland, 1500–2000 (2008). All these are published by Cambridge University Press.

Kidd was appointed Officer of the Order of the British Empire (OBE) in the 2023 New Year Honours for services to history, culture and politics.

References

20th-century Scottish historians
People educated at the Glasgow Academy
Fellows of All Souls College, Oxford
Academics of the University of Glasgow
Fellows of the Royal Historical Society
Fellows of the Royal Society of Edinburgh
Living people
Fellows of the British Academy
1964 births
Fellows of the Society of Antiquaries of Scotland
21st-century Scottish historians
Officers of the Order of the British Empire